Philipp Bonadimann (born 24 July 1980) is an Austrian alpine skier who won competed in two Winter Paralympics winning three  medals in sitting events. for Austria at the 2010 Winter Paralympics. He made his skiing debut in 2005 and besides skiing he competes in handcycling. Bonadimann has represented Austria at both the 2010 and 2014 Winter Paralympics and was his country's flag bearer at the opening ceremony at the 2014 Games in Sochi.

References 

Living people
1980 births
Sit-skiers
Austrian male alpine skiers
Paralympic bronze medalists for Austria
Paralympic silver medalists for Austria
Alpine skiers at the 2010 Winter Paralympics
Alpine skiers at the 2014 Winter Paralympics
Medalists at the 2010 Winter Paralympics
Medalists at the 2014 Winter Paralympics
Paralympic medalists in alpine skiing
Paralympic alpine skiers of Austria
People from Feldkirch, Vorarlberg
Sportspeople from Vorarlberg